Leeward Point Field , also known as Leeward Airfield, is a U.S. military airfield located at Naval Station Guantanamo Bay in Guantánamo Bay, Cuba.

Facilities

References

External links

 
 

Airports in Cuba
Guantanamo Bay Naval Base